Stenløse may refer to:

Stenløse, Denmark
Stenløse Municipality
Stenløse station
Stenløse BK
Stenløse, Odense, Denmark, see Odense Municipality#Neighbourhoods and settlements